Sedlec is a municipality and village in Prague-East District in the Central Bohemian Region of the Czech Republic. It has about 400 inhabitants.

History
The first written mention of Sedlec is from 1273.

References

External links

Villages in Prague-East District